Syncoryne is a genus of green algae, in the family Ulvellaceae.

References

Ulvophyceae genera
Ulvales